Mountain Paiko or Pajak in Bulgarian (Greek: Πάικο) is a small mountain range (surface area: 399 km2) that lies on the border of the Pella and Kilkis regional units in Central Macedonia, Greece.

Monasteries, Churches and Chapels of Paiko, in the Prefecture of Kilkis
The Administrative Head of the Monasteries and Churches of Paionia is the Metropolitan of Goumenissa, Axioupolis and Polykastro Dimitrios.

Church of Agios Athanasios 

The Church of Agios Athanasios is located in Griva.

Monastery of Panagia Goumenissa 

The monastery of Panagia Goumenissa, was the occasion to create the small town of the same name which is the seat of the newly established (since 1991 AD) Diocese of Goumenissi, Axioupolis and Polykastro.

Holy Monastery of Saints Raphael, Nicholas and Irene

The Holy Monastery of Saints Raphael, Nicholas and Irene is located on a verdant slope of Mount Paikos, at an altitude of 600 m. Overlooking the valley of Axios, in the area of Griva and at a distance of 7 km.  from Goumenissa.

Chapel of Saints Antonios and Theodoros Grivas

Outside Griva and at a distance of about 1.5 km, in a lush oak forest, is the chapel of Agios Antonios, a single-aisled basilica with a dome, which dates from 1901. The church was rebuilt in 1993.

Holy Monastery (convent) of Saint Nicodemus of Mount Athos

The Holy Monastery of Saint Nicodemus of Mount Athos is located in Central Macedonia and Paeonia of Kilkis.  It is built on the eastern slopes of Mount Paiko at an altitude of 700 meters and west of the river Axios. It is 70 km NW.  from Thessaloniki, 53 km W. from Kilkis and 22 km W.-ND.  from Polykastro.  To the east is Goumenissa, to the southeast is Pentalofos and to the northeast is Griva.  The monastery is manly and was founded in 1981. It is part of the Holy Monastery of Simon Petra of Mount Athos and ecclesiastically belongs to the Diocese of Goumenissa, Axioupolis and Polykastro.

Geography
Morphologically, Paiko is a curvy extension to the north east of the adjacent Voras mountain range. Together they surround the plain of Aridea. East and south of Paiko are the plains of the Vardar (Axios) river and the plains of Giannitsa respectively.

The highest peaks are Skra, Tsouma, Vertopia, Pirgos, Kadasti and Ghola Tsouka. Most areas of the plateau are residential or cultivated.

Geology
Paiko is composed of igneous and sedimentary rocks, mainly carbonatite and ophiolite. Sedimentary rocks are found mostly in the north eastern areas.

Hydrology

Paiko is rich in surface and underground bodies of water, often potable. Springs exist at the foothills and small wetlands, connected by several streams, can be found at high altitudes. Two waterfalls and a lagoon of blue-green waters are located near the Skra peak.

East of the mountain is a small artificial lake (Lake Metalleiou) 35 m deep and of circumference around 4 km.

Life

Flora
The vegetation of Paiko is considered lush. Large trees include:

pine
Quercus (oak) (especially Quercus pubescens and Quercus frainetto)
plane (especially Platanus orientalis)
alder (especially Alnus glutinosa)
beech
walnut
chestnut 
cedrus
willow
populus
apple trees

Smaller plants and fungi include:

Species of grass
Shrubs such as wild strawberries
Mushrooms - a rare species (Daedaleopsis septentrionalis) known only in northern areas was discovered in 2009.
Fern
Flowers like Primula vulgaris, Scilla bifolia, Viola odorata, Galanthus elwesii and Crocus veluchensis

Fauna

Beside mammals (deer, rabbits) and vultures, notable animals include:

Amphibians such as the great crested newt and the yellow-bellied toad.
Reptiles such as Hermann's tortoise.
The fish Sabanejewia aurata and the rare Mediterranean barbel.
Lepidoptera (57 species have been identified) such as the large copper butterfly and the Callimorpha quadripunctata moth.

At Lake Metalleiou humans have introduced trout. Fishing is allowed under controlled conditions.

See also
List of mountains in Greece
Battle of Skra-di-Legen

References

External links
Paiko terrain map by Geopsis

Paiko
 
Landforms of Central Macedonia
Paiko